Mack Cormier is an American politician for the state of Louisiana. He is a member of the Louisiana House of Representatives for the 105th district.

Cormier ran for the Louisiana House in the 2019 Louisiana elections. Cormier forced incumbent Chris Leopold, a Republican, into a runoff election, and defeated Leopold in the runoff.

His father, Amos Cormier Jr., and brother, Amos Cormier III, have served as president of Plaquemines Parish.

References

External links

Living people
People from Plaquemines Parish, Louisiana
Democratic Party members of the Louisiana House of Representatives
Year of birth missing (living people)
21st-century American politicians